Dragon flag may refer to:

 a flag featuring a dragon, including:
Flag of Bhutan
Flag of the Qing dynasty
Flag of Wales
 a type of crunch (exercise)

See also
List of flags by design#Animal, which includes flags with dragons